Jean-Berchmans-Marcel-Yves-Marie-Bernard Chabbert, OFM (31 December 1920 – 20 September 2016) was a French prelate of the Roman Catholic Church.

Chabbert was born in Castres and ordained a priest on 29 June 1947 in the Roman Catholic religious order of the Order of Friars Minor. Chabbert was appointed Coadjutor Archbishop of the Archdiocese of Rabat, in Morocco, as well as titular bishop of Quaestoriana on 13 April 1967 and was consecrated bishop on 7 July 1967; he succeeded to that see in 1968. Chabbert was then appointed bishop of the Diocese of Perpignan-Elne on 17 July 1982, and served there until his retirement on 16 January 1996. Chabbert died on 20 September 2016 at the age of 95.

References

External links
Catholic-Hierarchy
Rabat Diocese  (French)
Perpignan-Elne Diocese  (French)

1920 births
2016 deaths
People from Castres
French Roman Catholic bishops in Africa
Bishops of Perpignan
Franciscan bishops
French Friars Minor
20th-century Roman Catholic bishops in France
Roman Catholic archbishops of Rabat